95th Street may refer to:

95th Street (Chicago)
95th Street (Chicago State University) (Metra)
95th Street – Beverly Hills (Metra)
95th Street (Manhattan)